A tapering jig is a woodworking jig used to cut a progressively deeper cut along a workpiece usually parallel to the grain.

Tapering jigs are often used to create table legs, with the taper usually cut into the two sides of the leg facing the inside of the table.  There are various commercial varieties of tapering jigs, ranging for simple two hinged pieces of aluminum square tubing with a device to maintain angle settings, to more complex varieties that utilize clamps to affix the workpiece to a bed using toggle clamps or other clamping devices.

Many woodworkers prefer to make the jig in the shop in order to customize it to the particular project at hand.

See Also
Jig (tool)
Staircase jig
Sharpening jig

Woodworking jigs